Maison des Arts (French for: "House of Arts") is a museum in Bischwiller in the Bas-Rhin department of France. It is situated in a 17th-century house that was built for a farrier.

References

See also
List of museums in France

Art museums and galleries in France
Museums in Bas-Rhin